Calf Point is a point between the terminus of Nielsen Glacier and Penelope Point on the west shore of Robertson Bay, northern Victoria Land, Antarctica. The headland was charted and named in 1911 by the Northern Party, led by Victor Campbell, of the British Antarctic Expedition, 1910–13, and named because of the great number of young seals, known as calves, distributed nearby this headland. The feature lies situated on the Pennell Coast, a portion of Antarctica lying between Cape Williams and Cape Adare.

References
 

Headlands of Victoria Land
Pennell Coast